Haplopus is a genus of walkingsticks in the family Phasmatidae. There are about seven described species in Haplopus.

Species
These seven species belong to the genus Haplopus:
 Haplopus bicuspidatus (Haan, 1842)
 Haplopus brachypterus Hennemann, Conle & Perez-Gelabert, 2016
 Haplopus intermedius Hennemann, Conle & Perez-Gelabert, 2016
 Haplopus micropterus (Peletier de Saint Fargeau & Serville, 1828)
 Haplopus scabricollis (Gray, 1835)
 Haplopus sobrinus Hennemann, Conle & Perez-Gelabert, 2016
 Haplopus woodruffi Hennemann, Conle & Perez-Gelabert, 2016

References

Further reading

 

Phasmatidae
Articles created by Qbugbot